Doug Davies may refer to:

 Doug Davies (Australian footballer) (1930–1991), former Australian rules footballer
 Doug Davies (Canadian football) (born 1964), former Canadian football offensive lineman
 Doug Davies (rugby union) (1899–1987), Scottish international rugby union player
 Douglas Davies (born 1947), theologian
 Douglas Davies (cricketer) (1881–1949), South African cricketer
 Douglas Arthur Davies (1896–1992), British Royal Air Force officer
 Doug Davies (speedway rider) (born 1936), South African speedway rider

See also
Douglas Davis (disambiguation)